The Croatia men's national under-16 and under-17 basketball team are boys' basketball teams, administered by the Croatian Basketball Federation, that represents Croatia in international men's basketball competitions.  The Croatia men's national under-16 basketball team (Hrvatska kadetska reprezentacija) represents Croatia at the FIBA Europe Under-16 Championship, where it has a chance to qualify to the FIBA Under-17 World Championship.

World Cup competitive record

Past rosters

European Championship competitive record

Past rosters

See also 
 Croatia men's national basketball team
 Croatia men's national under-18 and under-19 basketball team

References

Men's national under-16 basketball teams
Men's national under-17 basketball teams
Croatia men's national basketball team